Isaac Thomas Joseph Rouaud-Simon (born 12 February 1998) is a Haitian professional footballer who plays as a goalkeeper for Championnat National 3 club Amilly and the Haiti national team.

Club career
Born in Haiti, Rouaud moved to France at a young age and began his career with the reserves of Le Mans, before stints with Saint-Malo, and Vannes. He moved to Belgium with Givry for the 2019–20 season. On 1 October 2020, he returned to France with J3S Amilly.

International career
Rouaud debuted with the Haiti national team in a 3–1 friendly win over Guyana on 11 June 2019. He was called up to represent Haiti at the 2021 CONCACAF Gold Cup.

References

External links
 
 

1998 births
Living people
Sportspeople from Port-au-Prince
Haitian footballers
Haiti international footballers
Haiti under-20 international footballers
Association football goalkeepers
Le Mans FC players
Vannes OC players
Division d'Honneur players
2021 CONCACAF Gold Cup players
Haitian expatriate footballers
Haitian expatriate sportspeople in France
Haitian expatriate sportspeople in Belgium
Expatriate footballers in France
Expatriate footballers in Belgium